Doratopteryx afra is a moth in the Himantopteridae family. It was described by Alois Friedrich Rogenhofer in 1884. It is found in South Africa and Tanzania.

References

Moths described in 1884
Himantopteridae